The Ngati Porou East Coast Rugby Football Union is a constituent union in the New Zealand Rugby Union. It is located on the East Coast of the North Island, based in Ruatoria. It is the smallest Union in New Zealand in the sense of player numbers and population base. Due to the high number of players from the Ngati Porou iwi, the team is often referred to as Ngati Porou East Coast.

The Ngati Porou East Coast team home ground is Whakarua Park, Ruatoria.   Ngati Porou East Coast were holders of the Meads Cup, defeating Wanganui 29–27 at Whakarua Park on 27 October 2012.

History
The Ngati Porou East Coast Rugby Football Union was formed in 1922 when they split from the Poverty Bay Rugby Football Union.

Ranfurly Shield
Ngati Porou East Coast has challenged for the Ranfurly Shield eight times losing heavily on each occasion.

Matches

Ngati Porou East Coast in Super Rugby
Ngati Porou East Coast along with Wellington, Wairarapa Bush, Wanganui, Poverty Bay, Hawke's Bay, Manawatu and Horowhenua-Kapiti make up the Hurricanes Super Rugby region.

Reputation
The team is renowned for losing 54 consecutive games.

However former all blacks Ma’a Nonu and Hosea Gear were involved in the side when they broke that drought in a 50-26 win over Buller.

All Blacks
They have had 6 players play for the All Blacks who have played rugby for the East Coast.

 A.C.R Jefferd
 G. Nēpia
 Z. Guildford
 H. Gear
 M. Nonu
 R. Gear

Clubs
Ngati Porou East Coast Rugby Football Union is made up of 9 clubs:
 Hicks Bay
 Hikurangi Sports Club
 Ruatoria City Sports Club
 Tawhiti
 Tokararangi
 Tokomaru Bay United
 Tihirau Victory Club (TVC)
 Uawa Sports
 Waiapu

Championships

Ngati Porou East Coast won the NPC 3rd Division twice, first in 1999 defeating Poverty Bay 18–15 in the final at Ruatoria and secondly and more impressively, defeating North Otago in front of their home crowd at Oamaru in a come-from-behind 25–21 victory to record back to back NPC 3rd Division Championships.

1999 NPC 3rd Division

 Overall Season standing: Champions

2000 NPC 3rd Division

 Overall Season standing: Champions

2012 Heartland Championship

 Overall Season standing: Champions

Heartland Championship placings

References

External links
 Official Site
 East Coast rugby (NZHistory.net.nz)

New Zealand rugby union teams
New Zealand rugby union governing bodies
Sport in the Gisborne District
Sports organizations established in 1922